Mahani or Mahoni or Mahuni may refer to:
 Mahani, Bushehr
 Mahani, Sistan and Baluchestan
 Mahani, South Khorasan